Amor, Luz Y Sonido Tour or (in English) Love, Light & Sound Tour was the thirth concert tour by Mexican singer Paulina Rubio, in support of her eighth studio album, Ananda (2006). The tour began on 23 February 2007 in Lanzarote, Canary Island at the Campo de Fútbol Arrecife and concluded on 30 September 2007 in Córdoba, Argentina at Orfeo Superdomo, consisting of 14 shows in Europe, 31 in United States and 8 shows in Latin America. It is considered her most extensive tour in Spain.

Background
Rubio revealed she chose the name of the tour, "Amor, Luz y Sonido" or "Love, Light and Sound" (in English) because "represents the bond she and her band share with fans through their music." She called the tour "agile, expressive and aggressive."

Set list
This set list represents the show on the Pearl Theatre inside the Palms Hotel and Casino in Las Vegas, Nevada.

"Ni Una Sola Palabra"
"Lo Haré Por Ti"
"Algo Tienes" 
"I Was Made for Lovin' You"  (KISS cover)
"Don't Say Goodbye" 
"No Te Cambio"
"Aunque No Sea Conmigo" 
"Dame Otro Tequila" 
"El Último Adiós"
"Hoy"
"Perros"
"Ayúdame"
"Nada Puede Cambiarme" 

Encore
"Te Quise Tanto"
"Y Yo Sigo Aquí"

Tour dates

References

2007 concert tours